This is a list of Latvian football transfers in the 2018–19 winter transfer window by club. Only transfers of the Virslīga are included.

Latvian Higher League

Riga FC 

In:

Out:

Ventspils 

In:

Out:

RFS 

In:

Out:

Liepāja 

In:

Out:

Spartaks 

In:

 

Out:

Jelgava 

In:

 

 

   

Out:

METTA/LU 

In:

Out:

Valmiera 

In:

Out:

Daugavpils 

In:

Out:

References

External links 
 sportacentrs.com 

2018-19
Latvia
Football
tansfers
tansfers